The 2000–01 Ohio State Buckeyes men's basketball represented the Ohio State University during the 2000–01 NCAA Division I men's basketball season. The Buckeyes received an at-large bid to the NCAA tournament as No. 5 seed in the East region, but were upset by No. 12 seed Utah State in the first round. The Buckeyes finished with a record of 20–11 (11–5 Big Ten), but all 31 games – including the NCAA Tournament appearance – were later vacated due to NCAA sanctions.

Roster

Schedule and results

|-
!colspan=9 style=| Regular season

|-
!colspan=9 style=| Big Ten tournament

|-
!colspan=9 style=| NCAA Tournament

Rankings

References

Ohio State
Ohio State Buckeyes men's basketball seasons
Ohio State
Ohio State Buckeyes
Ohio State Buckeyes